Paola Piazzolla (born 21 October 1996) is an Italian lightweight rower world champion at senior level at the World Rowing Championships.

Biography
Maregotto started the activity in 2008, having her senior debut in 2017. In addition to the international medal won at a senior level, at the youth level she won three more medals.

Achievements

References

External links
 

1996 births
Living people
Italian female rowers
World Rowing Championships medalists for Italy
Athletes of Fiamme Rosse
20th-century Italian women
21st-century Italian women